Paradoris indecora is a species of sea slug, a dorid nudibranch, shell-less marine gastropod mollusks in the family Discodorididae.

Distribution
This species occurs in the Northeast Atlantic Ocean, the Mediterranean Sea, and in the Atlantic Ocean along the Cape Verde Islands.

References

 Gofas, S.; Le Renard, J.; Bouchet, P. (2001). Mollusca, in: Costello, M.J. et al. (Ed.) (2001). European register of marine species: a check-list of the marine species in Europe and a bibliography of guides to their identification. Collection Patrimoines Naturels, 50: pp. 180–213
 Rolán E., 2005. Malacological Fauna From The Cape Verde Archipelago. Part 1, Polyplacophora and Gastropoda.
 *  Dayrat B. 2010. A monographic revision of discodorid sea slugs (Gastropoda, Opisthobranchia, Nudibranchia, Doridina). Proceedings of the California Academy of Sciences, Series 4, vol. 61, suppl. I, 1-403, 382 figs.

Discodorididae
Gastropods described in 1881
Molluscs of the Atlantic Ocean
Molluscs of the Mediterranean Sea
Gastropods of Cape Verde